Dieppe Park is a park in Montreal, Quebec, Canada. It is at the eastern tip of Cité du Havre, in the borough of  Ville-Marie. Between 1992 and 2017, it was known as Parc de la Cité-du-Havre. In 2017 it was named Dieppe Park to mark the 75th anniversary of the Dieppe Raid.

Despite it having an area of just 7 hectares, it is categorized by the city of Montreal as one of its large parks.

The park offers an excellent view of the Old Port of Montreal, Downtown Montreal, and the Jacques Cartier Bridge. It also is a viewing point of the Montreal Fireworks Festival.

Nearby is the original Habitat 67 housing complex, the renowned Montréal landmark built for Expo 67.

References 

Parks in Montreal
Ville-Marie, Montreal